Statistics of the 2004 National Football Championship (Bangladesh).

Overview
Brothers Union won the championship.

Playoff

Semifinals
Muktijoddha Sangsad KC 2-0 Mohammedan SC
Brothers Union 2-1 Abahani Ltd

Third place
Abahani Ltd 3-2 Mohammedan SC

Final
Muktijoddha Sangsad KC 0-0 (pen 2–4) Brothers Union
Brothers Union won the championship.

References
RSSSF

 
1